"American Park" may refer to

 American Park (Mexico City)
 League Park (Cincinnati), formerly called American Park